Sart Kalmyk is an endangered and underdocumented Central Mongolic Oirat language variety spoken by the Sart Kalmyks in Ak-Suu District, Issyk-Kul Region, Kyrgyzstan.

History
Sart Kalmyk emerged as a distinct variety after its speakers separated from a larger Oirat-speaking community in today's Xinjiang around 1864 and moved to the shores of Lake Issyk-Kul. Since then, the language has been developing in isolation from other Mongolic varieties and in intense contact with Kyrgyz, a Turkic language. Recent research shows a significant influence of Kyrgyz morphology, phonology and lexicon on Sart Kalmyk.

Language situation 
Sart Kalmyk is a severely threatened language. Its domains of use are largely confined to informal communication between the elderly in rural areas. Virtually all speakers are trilingual, having a good command of Kyrgyz and Russian in addition to their ethnic language. Younger members of the ethnic community often speak little to no Sart Kalmyk.

Script
Historically, Sart Kalmyk was written with the Clear script and, occasionally, a local version of the Arabic script. Both scripts have fallen out of use by the early 1940s. In 1934, a short-lived Latin alphabet-based orthography was introduced. Today, Sart Kalmyk is seldom used in writing, but when it is written, the Kalmyk version of Cyrillic is employed.

References

Languages of Kyrgyzstan
Central Mongolic languages